Cho Hye-ri (Hangul: 조혜리; born May 31, 1972), better known by her stage name Wax (Hangul: 왁스), is a South Korean pop singer. She debuted in 1998 as the lead vocalist of the rock band DOG. She released her first solo album, The Diary of Mom, in 2000. Wax made her acting debut in 2007 with a main role in the musical Fixing My Makeup, the plot of which is based on her hit song of the same name.

Biography 
Wax was born on May 31, 1972, with the birth name Cho Hye-Ri. Cho graduated from the Department of Postmodern Music at Kyung Hee University. Although she has been professionally active since 1998, her personal life has been mostly veiled from the public.

Career 
Her debut as a singer was as lead vocalist of the band Dog in 1998. The band only released one album, DOG-1st. The title track of the album was "Kyung Ah's Day", and the album also included nine other songs. After Dog disbanded, she made her solo debut with the stage name Wax in 2000. Her debut album as a soloist was  Vol. 1: The Diary of Mom, with a debut song called "Oppa", a cover version (without the suggestive lyrics) of Cyndi Lauper's "She Bop". As of 2012, she has released nine full-length albums and nine other albums. In addition, she has released songs for the original soundtracks of several dramas.

In 2007, Wax made her debut as a musical actress. She was cast as the main actress for the musical Fixing My Makeup, which had a plot based on her song of the same name.

Discography

Studio albums

OST and Singles

Compilations

Remake

Overseas

Awards 
 2001 – KBS: Singer of The Year Award 
 2001 – MBC: Best Top Ten Musicians Award
 2001 – Mnet:  Best Music-video Award
 2001 – 16th Golden Disk Award
 2002 – 17th Golden Disk Award
 2003 – SBS: Field of Ballad Award
 2003 – KMA: Singer of This Year Award
 2003 – 18th Golden Disk Award
 2009 – Achievement Award from Kyung Hee University

Mnet Asian Music Awards

See also 
K-pop
Korean rock

References

External links 

Official iME KOREA Profile

1972 births
Living people
K-pop singers
Place of birth missing (living people)
South Korean women pop singers
South Korean female idols
21st-century South Korean singers
21st-century South Korean women singers